Petru Dumitriu (8 May 1924 – 6 April 2002) was a Romanian-born novelist who wrote both in Romanian and in French.

Biography
Dumitriu was born in Baziaș, in the Banat region of Romania. His father was a Romanian army officer and his mother was Hungarian and spoke to her husband and son mostly in French, so that French was Petru Dumitriu's second language from childhood. After school in Romania, Dumitriu studied philosophy at the University of Munich with a Humboldt scholarship, but his studies were interrupted in 1944 when Romania changed sides in the Second World War.

After becoming a member of the Romanian Writers' Union committee in 1950, he became editor-in-chief at Viața Românească in 1953.

In 1960, Dumitriu fled from Romania to West Berlin, moved to Frankfurt am Main and later to Bad Godesberg, Germany, afinally settling in Metz, France. He did not return to Romania until 1996.

He was married twice: with Henriette Yvonne Stahl, a French-born Romanian writer 24 years his senior, in 1956 (they divorced after about one week), and the same year with Irina Medrea (divorced in 1988).

He had two daughters: Irene (born 1959) and Helene (born 1961)

Works
Partial list of publications:
 Bijuterii de familie, ESPLA, 1949; English translation by Edward Hyams, Family Jewels, Collins, 1961
 Drum fără pulbere (Road without dust), ESPLA, 1951
 Cronică de la câmpie (Chronicle of the plain), ESPLA, 1955
 Pasărea furtunii (Storm Bird), ESPLA, 1957
 Cronica de familie (Family Chronicle), ESPLA, 1957 (chapter filmed as An Unforgettable Summer)
 Incognito, Seuil, 1962; English translation by Norman Denny, Collins, 1964
 L'Extreme Occident (The Far West), Seuil, 1964
 Le sourire sarde (The Sardinian Smile), Seuil, 1967
 L'homme aux yeux gris (The man with grey eyes), Seuil, 1968
 Rendez-vous au jugement dernier, Seuil, 1961; English translation by Richard Howard, Meeting at the last judgment, Pantheon, 1962
 Au dieu inconnu. Confessio (To the unknown god. Confession), Seuil, 1979

(ESPLA: Editura de Stat pentru Literatură si Arta, [Romanian] State Publishing House for Literature and Art, Bucharest)

References

Romanian male novelists
1924 births
2002 deaths
Romanian people of Hungarian descent
Romanian defectors
Romanian expatriates in Germany
Romanian expatriates in France
Romanian writers in French
People from Caraș-Severin County
20th-century Romanian novelists
Romanian expatriates in West Germany